Founded in 2010 by Lauren Santo Domingo and Áslaug Magnúsdóttir, Moda Operandi is an online luxury fashion retailer that allows customers to preorder looks directly from designers, immediately after their runway show. The concept, which was conceived of by Magnusdottir in 2009, gives "women the power to choose from the full collection".

Moda Operandi hosts online trunk shows that let customers secure runway fashion months in advance by placing a 50-percent deposit. The site offers access to designer pieces that might not become available in traditional luxury retail stores.

On May 2, 2013, the company launched a punk-inspired collection from designers including Givenchy, Balmain, Vivienne Westwood, and Dolce & Gabbana. In 2013, Áslaug Magnúsdóttir left the company after an alleged falling out. In 2019, Ganesh Srivats, a former Tesla, Inc. sales executive became the CEO of Moda Operandi. Declining sales from COVID-19 pandemic caused Moda Operandi to shut down its men's business.

In April, 2022, the company announced a ban on the use of exotic skins in its products.

References

External links 
Moda Operandi

Online retailers of the United States